be quiet! is a brand owned by the German company Listan GmbH, which manufactures power supply units, CPU coolers, computer cases and case fans. The main target groups for products in the be quiet! range are PC enthusiasts and gamers as well as smaller and larger PC integrators. The company's headquarters is in Glinde, close to Hamburg. At present, the firm also has branches in Poland, Taiwan and China. The products of be quiet! are directly sold from Glinde to distributors and resellers worldwide. However, the major market of the be quiet! brand is Europe.

History
The be quiet! brand was registered in 2002 as a trademark of Listan GmbH. Initially only PC power supplies equipped with noise-minimizing technology were marketed under the brand name. From 2008, it was decided to add products for the cooling of PCs (CPU coolers and case fans) to the be quiet! range in addition to power supplies. In 2014, be quiet! added PC cases to the product portfolio. 
 
The readers of the German computer magazine PC Games Hardware elected be quiet! "Manufacturer of the Year" in the PSU category. Also in the election of the leading German online magazines Hardwareluxx be quiet! was chosen by the readers as "Manufacturer of the Year" in the PSU category. According to regular studies by the GfK Group, based on the numbers of units sold be quiet! is consistently concluded as market leader in Germany for PC power supplies, from 2006 to their latest study in 2017.

Products
All the organizational, administrative and logistics work as well as technical development of be quiet! products are performed at the headquarters in Germany. This includes all the necessary inspiration, product conception and design in addition to the final quality control.

In tune with the imperative in the brand name, a great deal of attention is paid in the development of all products in the be quiet! range to minimize noise. As a consequence the company has developed its own advanced technology and registered patents .

Power supply units

The main focus of be quiet! PC power supply products is the ATX format. However, the brand now also produces power supplies for SFX and TFX systems. The power supplies manufactured cover a spectrum of power classes from 300W to 1500W, focusing on high-end PC components.

PC cases
In August 2014, the brand be quiet! introduced its first midi-tower PC case Silent Base 800 to the market and since then introduced two further product series (Dark Base and Pure Base).

CPU cooler and case fans

In 2008, be quiet! extended its product palette with CPU coolers in tower, dual tower and top flow architectures. In addition, case fan models were produced with and without the PWM function in mounting sizes from 80 to 140 millimeters. In 2015, the be quiet! Pure Wings 2 case fan series won the European Hardware Awards, an annual selection of the very best hardware products available in the European market. In 2016, be quiet! extended its CPU cooler range with water coolers, in 240, 280 and 360mm formats.

Patents and utility models
For the technology it developed itself between 2009 and 2011, the company has lodged several registered designs and patents in diverse regions and countries. These all share the aim: Reduction of noise in addition to optimizing the operation in cooling and power supply components. One example is the "technology of aerodynamically optimized surface texture" as used in other industrial applications to reduce operational noise and improve airflow. This technology is applied to all be quiet! fans. The case fan series Silent Wings 2 and Shadow Wings have a further example of patented technology known as "anti-vibration mounts" that not only simplify the fitting and dampen the overall vibration, but also offer a flexible choice of mounting according to application. 
Another such technology is known as the "fan damping assembly" that reduces vibration with a rubber seal, simplifies the fitting procedures, and so significantly reduces the assembly time needed.
In addition, the company has registered another invention for a "device to anchor the fan" on the CPU cooler as a utility model. This facilitates the fitting, because the device clamps easily to the exterior of the heat sink. The bracing against the heat sink serves to absorb the fan vibrations well and so inhibits the generation of noise. 
The company also has a registered utility model for the "connector angular setting" for the cables of its power supply products. This special technology enables the setting and adjustment of the outlet cable angle, to suit the installation sites in differing PC configurations. This makes for tidy routing of the cables and improves the air circulation in the casing.

See also
Antec
Arctic
Corsair
Deepcool
Noctua
NZXT
Thermaltake
SilverStone Technology
Zalman

References

German brands
Computer hardware cooling
Computer enclosure companies
Computer power supply unit manufacturers